Alec John Bettinger (born July 13, 1995) is an American former professional baseball pitcher. He played in Major League Baseball (MLB) for one season with the Milwaukee Brewers.

Career
Bettinger attended Hylton High School in Woodbridge, Virginia and played college baseball at the University of Virginia. He was drafted by the Milwaukee Brewers in the 10th round of the 2017 MLB Draft. Bettinger made his professional debut with the rookie ball Helena Brewers. He split the 2018 season between the Single-A Wisconsin Timber Rattlers and the High-A Carolina Mudcats, accumulating a 6–10 record and 5.22 ERA in 25 games. In 2019, Bettinger spent the season in Double-A with the Biloxi Shuckers, pitching to a 5–7 record and 3.44 ERA with 157 strikeouts in 146.1 innings of work. 

Bettinger did not play in a game in 2020 due to the cancellation of the Minor League Baseball season because of the COVID-19 pandemic. The Brewers added him to their 40-man roster after the 2020 season.

On April 29, 2021, Bettinger was promoted to the major leagues for the first time. Bettinger made his MLB debut on May 2 as the starting pitcher against the Los Angeles Dodgers, but took the loss as he allowed 11 earned runs in four innings, including grand slams in each of the first two innings, by A. J. Pollock and Matt Beaty. Bettinger became the first player in the National League to allow more than ten earned runs in his major league debut since the earned run became official in 1912. 

Bettinger was removed from the 40-man roster and outrighted to the Triple-A Nashville Sounds on May 19, 2022. He made 13 appearances for Nashville in 2022, struggling to a 2–4 record and 6.49 ERA with 21 strikeouts in 34.2 innings pitched. He was released by the Brewers on August 6.

On August 23, 2022, Bettinger announced his retirement from professional baseball via Instagram.

References

External links

Living people
1995 births
Sportspeople from Alexandria, Virginia
Baseball players from Virginia
Major League Baseball pitchers
Milwaukee Brewers players
Virginia Cavaliers baseball players
Helena Brewers players
Wisconsin Timber Rattlers players
Carolina Mudcats players
Biloxi Shuckers players
Nashville Sounds players